Rujewa is an administrative ward in the Mbarali district of the Mbeya Region of Tanzania. In 2016 the Tanzania National Bureau of Statistics report there were 32,483 people in the ward, from 29,473 in 2012.

Vitongoji 
The ward has 60 vitongoji.

 CCM
 Chang'ombe
 Ibara A
 Ibara B
 Ihanga Kilabuni
 Ihanga Ofisini
 Isisi
 Jangurutu
 Kanisani
 Kanisani
 Kapunga
 Kati
 Kichangani
 Luwilindi Barabarani
 Luwilindi Kanisani
 Lyahamile
 Mabanda A
 Mabanda B
 Mafuriko
 Magea
 Magwalisi
 Mahango.
 Majengo
 Majengo
 Majengo
 Majengo Barabarani
 Majengo Mtoni
 Mbuyuni
 Mbuyuni
 Mdodela
 Mferejini
 Miembeni
 Mjimwema
 Mkanyageni
 Mkanyageni
 Mkwajuni
 Mkwajuni
 Mlimani
 Mogela
 Mogelo
 Mpakani
 Msimbazi
 Mtakuja
 Mtoni
 Musanga
 Muungano
 Nyaluhanga 'A'
 Nyaluhanga 'B'
 Nyamtowo
 Nyati
 Ofisini
 Simba
 Tembo 'A'
 Tembo 'B'
 Tenkini 'A'
 Tenkini 'B'
 Ukinga 'A'
 Ukinga 'B'
 Ukinga 'C'
 Wameli

References 

Wards of Mbeya Region